Narisingh Yadav (born 3 March 1992) is an Indian cricketer. He made his first-class debut for Manipur in the 2018–19 Ranji Trophy on 1 November 2018. He made his Twenty20 debut for Manipur in the 2018–19 Syed Mushtaq Ali Trophy on 21 February 2019. He made his List A debut on 21 February 2021, for Manipur in the 2020–21 Vijay Hazare Trophy.

References

External links
 

1992 births
Living people
Indian cricketers
Manipur cricketers
Place of birth missing (living people)